The Mingren is a Go competition in China organized by the Chinese Weiqi Association. The word míngrén means "brilliant man". The Mingren is equivalent to the Nihon-Kiin's Meijin and the Hanguk Kiwon's Myungin titles.

Outline
The Mingren is sponsored by the Zhongguo Qiyuan and the People's Daily. It consists of a preliminary tournament in which 32 players compete against one another to determine the challenger to the previous year's winner. The preliminary is a single-elimination format, and the title match is decided in a best-of-three. Prior to 2016, the final of the preliminary tournament was decided in a best-of-three, and the title match was decided in a best-of-five. The winner's purse is ¥300,000 ($46,834) and ¥80,000 ($12,486) for the runner-up, as of 2017.

Past Winners and Runners-up

See also
Meijin
Myungin

References

Go competitions in China
Recurring sporting events established in 1988